Little Big Man (Lakota: Wičháša Tȟáŋkala), or Charging Bear, was an Oglala Lakota, or Oglala Sioux, who was a fearless and respected warrior who fought under, and was distant cousin to, Crazy Horse ("His-Horse-Is-Crazy"). He opposed the 1868 Treaty of Fort Laramie and fought against efforts by the United States to take control of the ancestral Sioux lands in the Black Hills area of the Dakota Territory. He also fought at the Battle of Little Big Horn in the Montana Territory in 1876.  Late in life he decided to cooperate with the U.S. and may have been involved in the murder of his old ally and rival, Crazy Horse, at Fort Robinson in Nebraska in 1877.

Details
Little Big Man was Crazy Horse's lieutenant and threatened to kill the U.S. government commissioners negotiating with the Sioux for control of the Black Hills in 1875. He surrendered along with Crazy Horse in the late 1870s.

It was said the Little Big Man was crafty but with considerable ability and presence while being a recognized trouble maker. Little Big Man grabbed Crazy Horse's arm just before Crazy Horse was bayoneted. Crazy Horse's last words, uttered to Little Big Man and others after he was bayoneted by a soldier, were "Let me go my friends. You have got me hurt enough."

See also
Little Big Man (film)

References

External links
Little Big Man, Oglala Genealogy
Potted bio
The Black Hills

1840s births
Lakota leaders
Native American people of the Indian Wars
People of the Great Sioux War of 1876
People from South Dakota
Red Cloud's War
People of the American Old West
Year of death missing